Güzelçamlı (also referred to locally as Çamlı for short) is a sea-side town and municipality in the district of Kuşadası in Turkey's Aydın Province, and an increasingly popular tourist resort. It is situated at a distance of  following the shoreline southwards from the district's center of Kuşadası. The town borders the Dilek Peninsula-Büyük Menderes Delta National Park to its immediate south. The town's permanent population is around 10,000 but may rise to around 50,000 and possibly more in the summer with the arrival of tourists and owners of secondary houses. Güzelçamlı is becoming increasingly renowned in the market for foreign purchases of real estate in Turkey.

History

The history of Güzelçamlı dates as far back as 700 BC. In the Ionian era, the locality was the convention center of the Ionian city states and was named Panionium. The Ionians had formed a federation consisting of 12 Ionian cities and also held games here to mark their gatherings. During excavations in 1957 and 1958 an antique theater was uncovered, which had 12 rows of seats carved out of rock. Many famous battles were fought in this area, including the Battle of Mycale between the Greek and Persian forces.

During the Ottoman period, the town was often called Rumçamlısı (Greek Çamlı) and was entirely populated by Greeks. In the last phase of the Greco-Turkish War (1919-1922) (on 7 September 1922), with the Turkish army approaching, the town population had fled by boats and took refuge in the nearby island of Samos, after which the town had remained empty for about two years. In 1924, it has been re-populated by Turks from Leftere, near Kavala, under the scope of the population exchange between Greece and Turkey. The settlement's name was changed to Güzelçamlı, and after having had the status of a village for seventy years, Güzelçamlı was declared a township with its own municipality in 1992.

Tourism
Today, Güzelçamlı is a preserved resort town. There are several hotels, small pensions, holiday houses, restaurants, bars and shops. Monday is the usual market day of the town, during which a traditional bazaar is set along the main street once a week. On the beaches and along the bays of the  coastline, besides clean water, there are also opportunities for sailing, windsurfing, canoeing, water skiing, fishing, diving and boat tours. Other possibilities are paragliding, mountaineering, trekking, bird watching, botany tours, horse riding, cycling and hunting to an extent. In Güzelçamlı, there is usually a breeze from the sea during the day and a breeze from the mountains during the nights.

The Cave of Zeus is west of the town, within the Dilek Peninsula-Büyük Menderes Delta National Park.

See also
 Turkish Riviera
 Blue Cruise
 Foreign purchases of real estate in Turkey

References

External links
 BRIDGE TOURS - FIRST TRAVEL AGENCY IN GUZELCAMLI & DAVUTLAR AREA

Populated places in Aydın Province
Populated coastal places in Turkey
Turkish Riviera
Fishing communities in Turkey
Towns in Turkey
Seaside resorts in Turkey